is a railway station in Kashihara, Nara Prefecture, Japan.

Line
Kintetsu Railway
 Minami Osaka Line

Layout
The station has two side platforms and two tracks.

Adjacent stations

External links
 Bōjō Station (Kintetsu Corporation) (Japanese)

Railway stations in Japan opened in 1929
Railway stations in Nara Prefecture